Edward F. Kileen (January 12, 1869 – April 14, 1944) was a lawyer and teacher. He was a member of the Wisconsin State Senate.

Biography
Kileen was born on January 12, 1869, in Aurora, Waushara County, Wisconsin, to Michael Kileen and Hannah Navin. He grew up in Aurora and went to High School In Berlin, Wisconsin.  He graduated in 1890. He then became a teacher and taught for a few years.  He went off to attend Law school at the University of Wisconsin of which he graduated in 1894.  The same year he graduated Law school; he ran for District Attorney of Wautoma and won. In 1899 he married Anna Guinan with whom he had four children.

He further established himself in the city by building a grand home across from the County Jail in 1908.  By 1910 he ran for Senator and served two terms in the Wisconsin Senate. He was accredited with the establishment of the trout hatchery in Wild Rose, the Waushara County Normal School and many of the Waushara County Highways. He was a member of the Berlin chapter of the Knights of Columbus, Society of the Holy Name, and Wautoma Lions Club.

He died April 14, 1944, and is buried at Oakwood Cemetery in Berlin, Wisconsin.

Political career
Kileen was a member of the Senate from 1911 to 1915. Previously, he was District Attorney of Waushara County, Wisconsin, from 1895 to 1898 and again from 1901 to 1910; and was president of the Village of Wautoma for 8 years. He was a Republican.

Electoral history

References

1869 births
1944 deaths
People from Wautoma, Wisconsin
Republican Party Wisconsin state senators
Wisconsin lawyers
Schoolteachers from Wisconsin